Casa Grande District is one of eight districts of the province Ascope in Peru.

Localities
Roma

References